Wickelgren is a surname. Notable people with the surname include:

Abraham Wickelgren (born 1969), American lawyer
Kirsten Wickelgren, American mathmematician